The prosecutor general of Ukraine (also procurator general of Ukraine) heads the system of official prosecution in courts known as the Office of the Prosecutor General . The prosecutor general is appointed and dismissed by the president with consent of the Verkhovna Rada (Ukrainian parliament). The prosecutor serves a term of office of six years and may be forced to resign by a vote of no confidence in parliament. The current prosecutor general, since 27 July 2022, is Andriy Kostin.

The Prosecutor General's Office dates to 1917, established by the fledgling Ukrainian governments following the collapse of the Russian Empire, when the minister of justice held the office of prosecutor general. In 1922, it was reorganized under socialist law after the Ukrainian Soviet Socialist Republic became a founding member of the Soviet Union. With adoption of the 1936 Constitution of the Soviet Union, the office became directly subordinated to the Prosecutor General Office of the Soviet Union; this lowered the status of the office, with the prosecutor appointed by the Soviet Prosecutor General and having no government post in the Ukraine SSR. Following the dissolution of the Soviet Union in 1991, the Prosecutor General Office of Ukraine became an independent agency. The office is directly proscribed in the 1996 Constitution of Ukraine.

Duties and powers
The prosecutor general is appointed to office by the president of Ukraine with the consent of the Verkhovna Rada (parliament). The prosecutor is dismissed from office after serving a six-year term, or on order of the president, or the prosecutor may be forced to resign following a vote of no confidence in the Verkhovna Rada.

The powers of the office (from January 2017) are to:
provide organization and leadership of pre-trial investigations;
support public prosecution in the courts; and
represent the state's interest in the courts, according to the law.

The prosecutor general submits an annual report to the Verkhovna Rada about the legal situation in the country.

The prosecutor general creates a collegiate council consisting of the prosecutor general, their first and other deputies, the prosecutor of the Autonomous Republic of Crimea, and other leaders of prosecution agencies.

The prosecutor general office's General Inspectorate is an independent agency established to oversee the actions of the prosecutorial system. Its goals are to modernize the Soviet-era bureaucracy, to enhance inter-agency efficiency and international cooperation, and to fight corruption.

Structure

Prosecutor's Office of the Autonomous Republic of Crimea
Prosecutor's Office of Cherkasy Oblast
Prosecutor's Office of Chernihiv Oblast
Prosecutor's Office of Chernivtsi Oblast
Prosecutor's Office of Dnipropetrovsk Oblast
Prosecutor's Office of Donetsk Oblast
Prosecutor's Office of Ivano-Frankivsk Oblast
Prosecutor's Office of Kharkiv Oblast
Prosecutor's Office of Kherson Oblast
Prosecutor's Office of Khmelnytskyi Oblast
Prosecutor's Office of Kirovohrad Oblast
Prosecutor's Office of Kyiv City
Prosecutor's Office of Kyiv Oblast
Prosecutor's Office of Luhansk Oblast
Prosecutor's Office of Lviv Oblast
Prosecutor's Office of Mykolaiv Oblast
Prosecutor's Office of Odesa Oblast
Prosecutor's Office of Poltava Oblast
Prosecutor's Office of Rivne Oblast
Prosecutor's Office of Sumy Oblast
Prosecutor's Office of Ternopil Oblast
Prosecutor's Office of Vinnytsia Oblast
Prosecutor's Office of Volyn Oblast
Prosecutor's Office of Zakarpattia Oblast
Prosecutor's Office of Zaporizhia Oblast
Prosecutor's Office of Zhytomyr Oblast
Military Prosecutor's Office of Joint Forces
Military Prosecutor's Office of Ukrainian Central Region
Military Prosecutor's Office of Ukrainian Southern Region
Military Prosecutor's Office of Ukrainian Western Region
National Academy of Prosecution of Ukraine

Separate organizations
 Specialized Anti-Corruption Prosecutor's Office
 Military Prosecutor
 General Inspectorate
 Primary Trade Union Organization of the Prosecutor General Office of Ukraine employees

Leadership

 Prosecutor General – Iryna Venediktova (17 March 2020)
 Deputy Prosecutor General – Viktor Trepak (8 October 2019)
 Deputy Prosecutor General – Günduz Mamedov (18 October 2019)
 Deputy Prosecutor General—Director of Specialized Anti-Corruption Prosecutor's Office – Nazar Kholodnytskyi (30 November 2015)

History

Early period

The post of Prosecutor General of Ukraine was first established in 1917, following the dissolution of the Russian Empire. When the Ukrainian People's Republic was formed – after Ukraine declared its independence from the Russian Republic due to the Bolshevik's aggression – the post was held by the minister of justice.

Soviet period
After the occupation of Ukraine by Bolsheviks in June 1922, the Prosecutor's Office of the Ukrainian SSR was established. The prosecutor general was appointed by the Ukrainian government and remained merged with the minister of justice until the 1936 Constitution of the Soviet Union came into force, at which point the republican prosecution office of Ukraine was subordinated to the prosecutor general of the USSR.

Post-Soviet period

Following Ukrainian independence in 1991, the prosecutor general wielded considerable power as a legacy of the Soviet Union state prosecutor's office. Many of the office's functions were expanded in 1991, but in 2016 the powers of the office were decreased and limited.

Prior to January 2017, the term of authority of the prosecutor was five years. Since January 2017 this was increased to six years. This list below shows prosecutors of independent Ukraine. In the absence of the prosecutor general, the office is headed by their first deputy as the acting prosecutor general.

See also
Judicial system of Ukraine
Ministry of Justice (Ukraine)

Notes

References

External links
 Law of Ukraine "On Prosecutor"s Office"
 History. Prosecutor General's Office website

Prosecutor

 
Independent agencies of the Ukrainian government
Presidency of Ukraine